The Church of St Mary Magdalene and St Andrew is the Church of England parish church in Ridlington, Rutland. It is a Grade II* listed building.

History
The church is dedicated to St Mary Magdalene and St Andrew, but the Andrew may be a derivation of St Andresgil, whose feast day is the same as Mary Magdalene.

The church is 13th century but there was probably an older Anglo-Saxon one pre-occupying the spot. The church underwent a major Victorian restoration in 1860.

The church has a Jacobean memorial to James Harington and his wife facing each other, praying in a kneeling position.

Over the vestry door in the south aisle, is a Norman tympanum. Before the 1860 restoration, it was in two pieces in the external south wall of the chancel. The tympanum features a winged gryphon and a lion fighting with an 8-spoked wheel beneath.

References

Ridlington
Ridlington